Amguid is a village in the commune of Idlès, in Tazrouk District, Tamanrasset Province, Algeria.

Climate

Amguid has a hot desert climate (Köppen climate classification BWh), with very hot summers and mild winters, and very little precipitation throughout the year.

References

Neighbouring towns and cities

Populated places in Tamanrasset Province